Camp Davern is a traditional summer camp for boys and girls aged 6–16 years old located near Maberly, Ontario, Canada, 100 kilometers west of Ottawa.

The camp was established in 1946, and was operated by the YMCA until 2015.  It is now independently owned and operated and functions as an overnight summer camp and centre for outdoor education in the spring and fall.  Davern is proud of their now third-generation campers and its long legacy as one of Ontario oldest summer camps.  Originally, a Canadian Pacific Railway train brought campers from Ottawa, stopping on the rail line just north of the camp to drop them off.  Today, campers travel from Ottawa on chartered buses.

External links
 Camp Davern 

Summer camps in Canada
Youth organizations based in Canada
YWCA